WBIZ may refer to:

WBIZ (AM), a radio station (1400 AM) licensed to Eau Claire, Wisconsin, United States
WBIZ-FM, a radio station (100.7 FM) licensed to Eau Claire, Wisconsin, United States